Priyadarshini Residential High School is an educational institution in Pithapuram , East Godavari district, Andhra Pradesh, India.

High schools and secondary schools in Andhra Pradesh
Schools in East Godavari district
Educational institutions in India with year of establishment missing